Solan Municipal Corporation (SMC) is the municipal corporation of Solan District in Himachal Pradesh, and is the chief nodal agency for the administration of the city. Municipal Corporation mechanism in India was introduced during British Rule with formation of municipal corporation in Madras (Chennai) in 1688, later followed by municipal corporations in Bombay (Mumbai) and Calcutta (Kolkata) by 1762. Solan Municipal Corporation is headed by Mayor of city and governed by Commissioner. Solan Municipal Corporation has been formed with functions to improve the infrastructure of town.

History and administration 

Solan Municipal Corporation was formed in to improve the infrastructure of the town as per the needs of local population. Solan Municipal Corporation has been categorised into wards and each ward is headed by councillor for which elections are held every 5 years.

Solan Municipal Corporation is governed by mayor Mrs. Poonam Grover and administered by Municipal Commissioner Mr. Rajiv Kumar.

Revenue sources 

The following are the Income sources for the corporation from the Central and State Government.

Revenue from taxes 
Following is the Tax related revenue for the corporation.

 Property tax.
 Profession tax.
 Entertainment tax.
 Grants from Central and State Government like Goods and Services Tax.
 Advertisement tax.

Revenue from non-tax sources 

Following is the Non Tax related revenue for the corporation.

 Water usage charges.
 Fees from Documentation services.
 Rent received from municipal property.
 Funds from municipal bonds.

References

External links 
 Official website

Municipal corporations in India
Municipal corporations in Himachal Pradesh
Local government in Himachal Pradesh